A. walkeri may refer to:

 Acaulospora walkeri, a fungus species
 Amnicola walkeri, the Canadian duskysnail, a freshwater snail species
 Amphimoea walkeri, a moth species found from Mexico south to Argentina

See also